This is a list of episodes of Saturday Night Live Korea. Abbreviated as SNL Korea or SNLK, it is a South Korean late-night live television sketch comedy and variety television program that airs on general service cable channel tvN on Saturdays at 23:00. Adapted from the long-running American TV show Saturday Night Live on NBC, SNL Korea premiered on December 3, 2011, and season 9 premiered on March 25, 2017.

Series overview

Episodes

Season 1 (2011–12)
The first season ran from December 3, 2011 to January 21, 2012 for eight episodes.

Season 2 (2012)
The second season ran from May 26 to July 14, 2012 for eight episodes.

Season 3 (2012)
The third season ran from September 8 to November 15, 2012 for seventeen episodes.

Season 4 (2013)

Season 5 (2014)

Season 6 (2015)

Season 7 (2016)

Season 8 (2016)

Season 9 (2017)

Season 10 (2021)
Beginning with this season, all episodes of SNL Korea are aired exclusively on the streaming platform Coupang Play.

Season 11 (2021–22)

Season 12 (2022)

Notes

References

External links
 SNL Korea official tvN website 
 
 

episodes
Saturday Night Live Korea episodes
Saturday Night Live Korea episodes